The year 1986 was marked by many events that left an imprint on the history of Soviet and Russian Fine Arts.

Events
 Exhibition of works by Elena Kostenko was opened in the Leningrad Union of Artists.
 Traditional Exhibition of works of Leningrad artists – the Great Patriotic war veterans was opened in the Leningrad Union of Artists on the eve of Victory Day (9 May).
 Exhibition of works by Boris Lavrenko was opened in the Museum of the Academy of Arts in Leningrad.
 Exhibition of works by Boris Shamanov was opened in the Leningrad Union of Artists.
 Exhibition of works by Yaroslav Nikolaev (1899–1978) was opened in the Leningrad Union of Artists.
 Exhibition of works by Piotr Fomin was opened in the «Manezh» Central Exhibition Hall in the Moscow.
 Exhibition of works by Piotr Buchkin (1886–1965) was opened in the Leningrad Union of Artists.
 Exhibition of works by Yaroslav Krestovsky was opened in the Central House of Artists in Moscow.

Deaths
 February 12 — Elena Skuin, Russian soviet painter and graphic artist (b. 1908).
 March 27 — Mikhail Poniatov, Russian soviet painter (b. 1905).
 June 8 — Victor Tsiplakov,, Russian soviet painter, People's Artist of the RSFSR (b. 1915).
 June 26 — Vadim Sidur, Russian soviet sculptor (b. 1924).
 August 2 — Vsevolod Bazhenov, Russian soviet painter (b. 1909).
 August 6 — Nikolai Mukho, Russian soviet painter (b. 1913).

See also

 List of Russian artists
 List of painters of Leningrad Union of Artists
 Saint Petersburg Union of Artists
 Russian culture
 1986 in the Soviet Union

References

Sources
 Лавренко Борис Михайлович. Выставка произведений. Каталог. Л., Художник РСФСР, 1986.
 Борис Иванович Шаманов. Выставка произведений. Каталог. Л., Художник РСФСР, 1986.
 Хаустов Андрей Иванович (1930–1978). Выставка произведений. Каталог. Л., Художник РСФСР, 1986.
 Петр Дмитриевич Бучкин. Выставка произведений. Каталог. Л., Художник РСФСР, 1986.
 Михаил Петрович Железнов. Выставка произведений. Каталог. Л., Художник РСФСР, 1986.
 Мы побратимы – сохраним мир. Третья совместная выставка произведений художников Ленинграда и Дрездена. Дрезден, 1986.
 Ярослав Крестовский. Каталог выставки. М., Советский художник, 1986.
 Ярослав Сергеевич Николаев. Сборник материалов и каталог выставки произведений. Л., Художник РСФСР, 1986.
 Елена Михайловна Костенко. Каталог выставки.. Л., Художник РСФСР, 1986.
 Романычев Александр Дмитриевич. Выставка произведений. Каталог. Л., Художник РСФСР, 1986.
 Artists of Peoples of the USSR. Biography Dictionary. Vol. 1. Moscow, Iskusstvo, 1970.
 Artists of Peoples of the USSR. Biography Dictionary. Vol. 2. Moscow, Iskusstvo, 1972.
 Directory of Members of Union of Artists of USSR. Volume 1,2. Moscow, Soviet Artist Edition, 1979.
 Directory of Members of the Leningrad branch of the Union of Artists of Russian Federation. Leningrad, Khudozhnik RSFSR, 1980.
 Artists of Peoples of the USSR. Biography Dictionary. Vol. 4 Book 1. Moscow, Iskusstvo, 1983.
 Directory of Members of the Leningrad branch of the Union of Artists of Russian Federation. – Leningrad: Khudozhnik RSFSR, 1987.
 Artists of peoples of the USSR. Biography Dictionary. Vol. 4 Book 2. – Saint Petersburg: Academic project humanitarian agency, 1995.
 Link of Times: 1932 – 1997. Artists – Members of Saint Petersburg Union of Artists of Russia. Exhibition catalogue. – Saint Petersburg: Manezh Central Exhibition Hall, 1997.
 Matthew C. Bown. Dictionary of 20th Century Russian and Soviet Painters 1900-1980s. – London: Izomar, 1998.
 Vern G. Swanson. Soviet Impressionism. – Woodbridge, England: Antique Collectors' Club, 2001.
 Петр Фомин. Живопись. Воспоминания современников. СПб., 2002. С.107.
 Время перемен. Искусство 1960—1985 в Советском Союзе. СПб., Государственный Русский музей, 2006.
 Sergei V. Ivanov. Unknown Socialist Realism. The Leningrad School. – Saint-Petersburg: NP-Print Edition, 2007. – , .
 Anniversary Directory graduates of Saint Petersburg State Academic Institute of Painting, Sculpture, and Architecture named after Ilya Repin, Russian Academy of Arts. 1915 – 2005. – Saint Petersburg: Pervotsvet Publishing House, 2007.

Art
Soviet Union